Gary Mokotoff (born April 26, 1937) is an author, lecturer, and Jewish genealogy researcher. Mokotoff is the publisher of AVOTAYNU, the International Review of Jewish Genealogy, and is the former President of the International Association of Jewish Genealogical Societies (IAJGS). He is the creator of the JewishGen's Jewish Genealogical Family Finder and the Jewish Genealogical People Finder. He co-authored the Daitch–Mokotoff Soundex system. Mokotoff is co-author of Where We Once Walked: A Guide to the Jewish Communities Destroyed in the Holocaust.

Early life 
Mokotoff was born in New York City to parents Sylvia Mokotoff (née Friedberg) and Jack Mokotoff. He grew up on the Lower East Side of Manhattan, spending his teenage years in Queens. His grandparents were Jewish immigrants from Russia-Poland.

Career

Computer career 

Mokotoff joined the IBM Applied Programming Department in 1959, working on developing systems software for the yet-to-be-announced IBM 1401. He is the author of SPS-1, SPS-2 IBM 1401 Symbolic Programming System, coauthor of 1401 Autocoder and participated in the 1401 Fortran II compiler project.

In 1965, Mokotoff was drafted into the U.S. Army and spent his entire two-year career in the data processing department at Fort Dix Army Air Base in Fort Dix, New Jersey. He led the team that installed the first computer at Fort Dix (an IBM 1401). For his efforts, he received a Certificate of Achievement from the Commanding General of the base. When he left the Army, he had achieved the rank of Specialist Fifth Class. In 1967, he returned to IBM.

In 1968, Mokotoff left IBM to form his own software company with partner Stanley F. Smillie. The company catered primarily to the retail industry. In the 1980s, the company, Data Universal Corp, developed a software system called Riva which it installed in early computer systems at such national retail chains as The Children's Place, Linens N Things and Bed, Bath & Beyond.

In 1985, he assisted the American Gathering of Jewish Holocaust Survivors and their Descendants to computerize the National Registry of Jewish Holocaust Survivors. This database is now located at the United States Holocaust Memorial Museum.

Genealogy career 

The Forward calls Mokotoff an "all-around makher (Yiddish for mover and shaker) in the Jewish genealogical world."  Mokotoff became involved in genealogy in 1979 to prove, successfully, that all persons named Mokotoff/Mokotov/Mokotow have a common ancestor. In 1980, he joined the Jewish Genealogical Society Inc (New York) and the following year became a member of its board of directors. During his tenure on the board, he used his computer background to develop some of the earliest databases for Jewish genealogy including the Jewish Genealogical Family Finder (now called JewishGen Family Finder), a database used by more than 100,000 Jewish genealogists.

Recognizing that there were many spelling variants of Eastern European Jewish surnames, even though they sounded similar, Mokotoff collaborated with Randy Daitch to create the Daitch–Mokotoff Soundex, system which provides a phonetic alternative to searching databases of names.

In 1984, Mokotoff and Sallyann Amdur Sack formed a company, Avotaynu, Inc, which publishes Avotaynu Magazine. This journal has been published quarterly since 1985. In 1991, the company expanded its effort into book publishing with Where We Once Walked: A Guide to the Jewish Communities Destroyed in the Holocaust, a gazetteer which lists more than 23,000 towns in Central and Eastern Europe with large Jewish communities prior to the Holocaust. Originally published in 1991, with a revised edition in 2002, Judaica Librarianship calls Where Once We Walked, "the de facto print gazetteer of the shtetlekh of the Pale of Settlement."  The book won the 1991 "Best Reference Book Award" of the Association of Jewish Libraries. Since then, Avotaynu has published more than 70 books, five of which have won awards. In 2003, the Association of Jewish Libraries gave Avotaynu Inc its "Body of Work Award." This award has been given only five times in the past 20 years.

In 1987, at the request of Rabbi Malcolm H. Stern and Sallyann Amdur Sack, Mokotoff founded the International Association of Jewish Genealogical Societies, the international organization of Jewish genealogical societies all over the world.

In 1990, Mokotoff became a member of the Board of Directors of the Federation of Genealogical Societies (FGS). He served on the board, with some interruption, for 15 years. In 2002, he served four years on the Board of the Association of Professional Genealogists.

In 2001, Mokotoff created the weekly e-zine of Jewish genealogy, called Nu? What’s New?

Leadership 
 1981-1995: Board Member, Jewish Genealogical Society of New York. Also: Treasurer 1985-1989
 1986-1989: Member, Advisory Committee, Douglas E. Goldman Genealogy Center, Beit Hatfutsot, Tel Aviv, Israel, where he assisted in promoting, worldwide, the family tree database of the Center
 1989-1994: Member, Advisory Committee on Russian-American Genealogical Archival Service (RAGAS), which established the first exchange of genealogical data between the U.S. and Russia
 1989-1995: Founding President, International Association of Jewish Genealogical Societies (IAJGS)
 1991-2006: Board Member, Federation of Genealogical Societies (FGS). Also: Treasurer 1995–1998; Vice-President Development 1999–2000
 1995-2001: Board Member, Jewish Book Council
 1996-2001: Board Member, Association of Jewish Book Publishers
 1996-2002: Board Member, JewishGen
 2002-2005: Board Member, Association of Professional Genealogists. Also: Treasurer 2002-2005
 2004–present: Founding Committee Member, International Institute of Jewish Genealogy, Jerusalem, Israel
 2009–present: Member, Board of Governors, JewishGen. Also: Board Member 1996-2002; Co-Chair, Board of Governors 2009-2014

Additionally, Mokotoff has acted as a consultant for Ancestry.com in the area of Jewish genealogical resources and is the author of "Where Do I Begin" in the Jewish genealogy section of Ancestry.com.

Honors 
 1985: Certified Systems Professional
 1986: Certified Data Processor
 1991: Reference Award from the Association of Jewish Libraries
 1993: George E. Williams Award of the Federation of Genealogical Societies
 1997: David S. Vogels, Jr. Award of the Federation of Genealogical Societies
 1998: Lifetime Achievement Award of the International Association of Jewish Genealogical Societies (IAJGS) (first recipient)
 2006: Grahame T. Smallwood Award of the Association of Professional Genealogists
 2006: Rabbi Malcolm H. Stern Humanitarian Award of the Federation of Genealogical Societies
 2008: Honorary Life Membership in the Association of Professional Genealogists

Personal life 
Mokotoff married Ruth Mokotoff (née Auerbach) in 1965. They have three children and eight grandchildren. He and his wife were members of Mensa International.

Works and publications 
 Mokotoff, Gary and Sallyann Amdur Sack, Where We Once Walked: A Guide to the Jewish Communities Destroyed in the Holocaust, Teaneck, N.J.: Avotaynu. 1991 (first edition).  
 Mokotoff, Gary, How to Document Victims and Locate Survivors of the Holocaust. Teaneck, N.J.: Avotaynu. 1995.  
 Mokotoff, Gary and Warren Blatt, Getting Started in Jewish Genealogy. Bergenfield, N.J..: Avotaynu. 1999.  
 Mokotoff, Gary and Sallyann Amdur Sack with Alexander Sharon, Where Once We Walked: A Guide to the Jewish Communities Destroyed in the Holocaust. Bergenfield, N.J.: Avotaynu. 2002 (second, revised edition).  
 Sack, Sallyann and Gary Mokotoff eds., Avotaynu Guide to Jewish Genealogy. Bergenfield, N.J.: Avotaynu. 2004.  
 Mokotoff, Gary ed., Every Family has a Story: Tales from the Pages of Avotaynu. Bergenfield, N.J.: Avotaynu. 2008.  (correct number on book)  (LC number that is cataloged) 
 Mokotoff, Gary, Getting Started in Jewish genealogy - 2012 Edition, Bergenfield, N.J..: Avotaynu. 2011.

See also 
 Jewish genealogy
 International Association of Jewish Genealogical Societies ("IAJGS")
 JewishGen
 Daitch–Mokotoff Soundex
 Avotaynu Magazine
 Sallyann Amdur Sack
 Where Once We Walked: A Guide to the Jewish Communities Destroyed in The Holocaust
 IBM 1401 Symbolic Programming System

References

Further reading 
 Sack, Sallyann Amdur,1936-. Sallyann Amdur Sack Papers (1936-), Undated, 1962-1972, 1978-2007 (Bulk 1980s). Boston, MA and New York, NY: Center for Jewish History. undated, 1962-2007. 
 Sack co-founded Avotaynu with Mokotoff
 P-917 Finding Aid at Center for Jewish History
 Mokotoff, Gary. The Family Mokotow : Ha-mishpaḥa Mokotov. Northvale, New Jersey: 1983. 
 Mokotoff, Gary. Collection of IBM 1401 Program Listings (CBI 93). Charles Babbage Institute, University of Minnesota, Minneapolis: 1985.

External links 
 Avotaynu
 Gary Mokotoff at Association of Professional Genealogists

American genealogists
1937 births
Living people
IBM employees
Jewish genealogy
Jewish historians